Radio spectrum pollution is the straying of waves in the radio and electromagnetic spectrums outside their allocations that cause problems for some activities.  It is of particular concern to radio astronomers.

Radio spectrum pollution is mitigated by effective spectrum management.  Within the United States, the Communications Act of 1934 grants authority for spectrum management to the President for all federal use (47 U.S.C. 305). The National Telecommunications and Information Administration (NTIA) manages the spectrum for the Federal Government. Its rules are found in the "NTIA Manual of Regulations and Procedures for Federal Radio Frequency Management".  The Federal Communications Commission (FCC) manages and regulates all domestic non-federal spectrum use (47 U.S.C. 301).  Each country typically has its own spectrum regulatory organization.  Internationally, the International Telecommunication Union (ITU) coordinates spectrum policy.

See also
 Spectrum management
 Electromagnetic radiation and health
 Frequency allocation
 Radio quiet zone

References

External links
Time Warner Cable's TV channel shift draws interference from Verizon LTE smartphones December 4, 2013 Fierce Wireless

Electromagnetic spectrum
Light pollution
Radio communications
Radio astronomy
Radio spectrum
Pollution

de:Elektrosmog
fr:Pollution électromagnétique
it:Elettrosmog